The Qinzhou–Dongxing Expressway, commonly referred to as the Qindong Expressway is an expressway that connects Qinzhou, Guangxi, China, and Dongxing, Guangxi. The expressway is a spur of G75 Lanzhou–Haikou Expressway and is entirely in Guangxi Province.

Dongxing is on the China–Vietnam border and there is a border crossing between Dongxing and Mong Cai. There will be a direct connection to the Vietnamese expressway network in the future. Currently, the expressway is complete only from Qinzhou to Gangkou District, Fangchenggang.

The expressway connects the following cities, all of which are in Guangxi Province:
Qinzhou
Fangchenggang
Dongxing

References

Chinese national-level expressways
Expressways in Guangxi